Just for You may refer to:

Film
 Just for You (1952 film), an American musical film directed by Elliott Nugent
 Just for You (1964 film), a film featuring The Warriors
 Just for You (2017 film), a South Korean film directed by Park Byoung-hwan

Music

Albums 
 Just for You (Gladys Knight album), 1994
 Just for You (Lionel Richie album) or the title song (see below), 2004
 Just for You (The McCrarys album) or the title song, 1980
 Just for You (Neil Diamond album), 1967
 Just for You, or the title song, by Gwen Guthrie, 1985

Songs 
 "Just for You" (Lionel Richie song), 2004
 "Just for You" (M People song), 1997
 "Just for You", by Alan Price, 1978
 "Just for You", by Aretha Franklin from The Electrifying Aretha Franklin, 1962
 "Just for You", by Bing Crosby from Selections from the Paramount Picture "Just for You", 1952
 "Just for You", by Celia Black, the B-side of "Anyone Who Had a Heart"
 "Just for You", by The Glitter Band, 1974
 "Just for You", by Julian Lennon from Everything Changes, 2011
 "Just for You", by Level 42 from Retroglide, 2006
 "Just for You", by Michelle McManus, 2007
 "Just for You", by Peter Green from In the Skies, 1979

Other media 
 Just for You, a 1975 Little Critter book by Mercer Mayer

ca:Just for You